Turriconus is a subgenus of sea snails, marine gastropod mollusks in the genus Conus, family Conidae, the cone snails and their allies.

In the latest classification of the family Conidae by Puillandre N., Duda T.F., Meyer C., Olivera B.M. & Bouchet P. (2015), Turriconus has become a subgenus of Conus as Conus (Turriconus)Shikama & Habe, 1968  (type species:  Turriconus nakayasui Shikama & Habe, 1968): synonym of  Conus Linnaeus, 1758

Species
 Turriconus acutangulus (Lamarck, 1810): synonym of  Conus acutangulus Lamarck, 1810 (alternate representation)
 Turriconus andremenezi (Olivera & Biggs, 2010): synonym of  Conus andremenezi Olivera & Biggs, 2010
 Turriconus beatrix (Tenorio, Poppe & Tagaro, 2007): synonym of  Conus beatrix Tenorio, Poppe & Tagaro, 2007
 Turriconus excelsus (G.B. Sowerby III, 1908): synonym of  Conus excelsus G. B. Sowerby III, 1908 (alternate representation)
 Turriconus gratacapii (Pilsbry, 1904) : synonym of Conus gratacapii Pilsbry, 1904
 Turriconus milesi (E. A. Smith, 1887) : synonym of Conus milesi E. A. Smith, 1887
 Turriconus miniexcelsus (Olivera & Biggs, 2010): synonym of  Conus miniexcelsus Olivera & Biggs, 2010
 Turriconus nakayasui Shikama & Habe, 1968 : synonym of Conus excelsus G. B. Sowerby III, 1908
 Turriconus praecellens (A. Adams, 1855): synonym of  Conus praecellens A. Adams, 1855
 Turriconus rizali (Olivera & Biggs, 2010): synonym of  Conus rizali Olivera & Biggs, 2010

References

External links
 To World Register of Marine Species

Conidae
Gastropod subgenera